Flavio Schmid (born 6 February 1980) is a footballer from Switzerland who currently plays as defender for FC Baden in Switzerland. He has previously played for FC Aarau where he began his career.

References

1980 births
Living people
Swiss men's footballers
FC Aarau players
FC Baden players
Association football defenders